Aurel Crâsnic (11 May 1926 – 2 February 1968) was a Romanian footballer who played as a goalkeeper.

International career
Aurel Crâsnic played one friendly game at international level for Romania, replacing Ion Voinescu in the 79th minute of a 1–0 victory against Poland. He was part of Romania's squad at the 1952 Summer Olympics.

Honours
Jiul Petroșani
Divizia B: 1960–61

Notes

References

External links

Aurel Crâsnic at Labtof.ro

1926 births
1968 deaths
Romanian footballers
Romania international footballers
Association football goalkeepers
Olympic footballers of Romania
Footballers at the 1952 Summer Olympics
Liga I players
Liga II players
CSM Jiul Petroșani players